3544 Borodino is a stony background asteroid from the inner regions of the asteroid belt, approximately  in diameter. It was discovered on 7 September 1977, by Soviet astronomer Nikolai Chernykh at the Crimean Astrophysical Observatory in Nauchnij, on the Crimean peninsula. The likely elongated S-type asteroid has a rotation period of 5.44 hours. It was named for the Russian village of Borodino where the Battle of Borodino took place.

Orbit and classification 

Borodino is a non-family asteroid from the main belt's background population. It orbits the Sun in the inner asteroid belt at a distance of 1.9–2.9 AU once every 3 years and 9 months (1,359 days; semi-major axis of 2.4 AU). Its orbit has an eccentricity of 0.22 and an inclination of 9° with respect to the ecliptic.

Naming 

This minor planet was named after the Russian village of Borodino near Moscow where the Battle of Borodino took place in September 1812 during the Napoleonic Wars. The official naming citation was published by the Minor Planet Center on 10 November 1992.

Physical characteristics 

Borodino is an assumed stony S-type asteroid, which agrees with the albedo measured (see below) by the Wide-field Infrared Survey Explorer (WISE).

Rotation period 

Several rotational lightcurves of Borodino have been obtained from photometric observations since 2007. Best-rated lightcurve by Australian amateur astronomer David Higgins at the Hunters Hill Observatory  gave a rotation period of 5.442 hours with a brightness variation of 0.60 magnitude. Other observations by French amateur astronomer Patrick Mazel, by astronomers at Texas A&M University, using the SARA-telescopes of the Southeastern Association for Research and Astronomy consortium, and by astronomers at the Oakley Southern Sky Observatory, Australia, gave a period of 5.435, 5.437 and 5.44 hours with an amplitude of 0.74, 0.65 and 0.63 magnitude, respectively. A high brightness amplitude is indicative of a non-spherical shape.

Poles 

Each modeled lightcurve also determined two spin axes of (104.0°, −57.0°) and (267.0°, −53.0°), as well as (294.0°, −60.0°) and (157.0°, −57.0°) in ecliptic coordinates (λ, β), respectively.

Diameter and albedo 

According to the surveys carried out by the Japanese Akari satellite and the NEOWISE mission of NASA's WISE telescope, Borodino measures between 6.11 and 8.688 kilometers in diameter and its surface has an albedo between 0.2361 and 0.474. The Collaborative Asteroid Lightcurve Link assumes an albedo of 0.20 and calculates a diameter of 9.84 kilometers based on an absolute magnitude of 12.4.

Notes

References

External links 
 
 Lightcurve Database Query (LCDB), at www.minorplanet.info
 Dictionary of Minor Planet Names, Google books
 Asteroids and comets rotation curves, CdR – Geneva Observatory, Raoul Behrend
 Discovery Circumstances: Numbered Minor Planets (1)-(5000) – Minor Planet Center
 
 

003544
Discoveries by Nikolai Chernykh
Named minor planets
19770907